Mountnorris is a small village and townland in County Armagh, Northern Ireland. The village also extends into the townland of Tullyherron. It lies about six miles south of Markethill. It is within the Armagh, Banbridge and Craigavon local government area. It had a population of 155 people (79 households) in the 2011 Census. (2001 Census: 165 people)

History 
The townland of Mountnorris was historically called Aghnecranagh and Aghenecranagh. In 1600 Lord Mountjoy built an earthwork fort and left a garrison of 400 men under the command of Captain Edward Blaney in Mountnorris. The area took its name by combining the names of Mountjoy and his campaign commander in the Low Countries, Sir John Norris.

By 1620, the village no longer had a garrison and in the 18th century passed into the hands of the Cope family of Loughgall, to become a rural settlement with no military connections. The village was the originally intended site of the Royal School but due to instability at the time in Ulster, the school was resituated to its current site in Armagh and was opened in 1608.

On 31 May 1991, during "The Troubles", the Provisional IRA carried out a large truck bomb attack against the British Army (Ulster Defence Regiment) base at nearby Glenanne. It killed three soldiers and wounded another ten. It is often called the "Glenanne barracks bombing".

Climate

People 

Andrew Trew Wood (1826–1903), a Canadian businessman and parliamentarian, was born in Mountnorris.
Billy Wright (1960–1997, the loyalist paramilitary leader, was raised in Mountnorris. He founded the Loyalist Volunteer Force (LVF) in 1996 and was assassinated in 1997 by the Irish National Liberation Army (INLA).

Education 

Mountnorris Primary School
St. Teresa's Primary School

References 

Visit Armagh

See also 
List of towns and villages in Northern Ireland

Villages in County Armagh
Townlands of County Armagh